The 2006–07 Golden State Warriors season was the 61st National Basketball Association (NBA) season for the Golden State Warriors basketball franchise, and their 34th overall while based in Oakland, California. Following the 2005–06 season, in which the Warriors ranked last in their division, the team roster was greatly revamped following a blockbuster eight-player deal with the Indiana Pacers in January 2007. After an average start to the 2006–07 season, Golden State made a dramatic turn-around, ending the year on a 16–5 run, and capturing the eighth seed in the Western Conference, marking their return to the post-season after a thirteen-year hiatus, having last made the playoffs in 1994. The Warriors met the top-seeded Dallas Mavericks in the first round of the playoffs, and shocked many in the basketball world when they defeated the Mavericks four games to two, for their first playoff series win since 1991, and becoming the third eighth-seeded team in NBA history to eliminate a first-seeded team in the playoffs, following the Denver Nuggets in 1994, and the New York Knicks in 1999. However, the Warriors met the Utah Jazz in the second round, and were defeated one game to four.

The Warriors would not make the playoffs again until 2013.

“We Believe” became the Warriors’ slogan for the last two months of the season and the playoffs.

Draft

Regular season

Standings

Record vs. opponents

Season standings

Game log

November
Record: 9–7 ; Home: 8–4 ; Road: 1–3

December
Record: 7–9 ; Home: 5–1 ; Road: 2–8

January
Record: 5–9 ; Home: 4–3 ; Road: 1–6

February
Record: 5–8 ; Home: 3–1 ; Road: 2–6

March
Record: 8–6 ; Home: 6–1 ; Road: 2–5

April
Record: 8–1 ; Home: 4–0 ; Road: 4–1

 Green background indicates win.
 Red background indicates regulation loss.

Playoffs

|- align="center" bgcolor="#ccffcc"
| 1
| April 22
| @ Dallas
| W 97–85
| Baron Davis (33)
| Baron Davis (14)
| Baron Davis (8)
| American Airlines Center20,732
| 1–0
|- align="center" bgcolor="#ffcccc"
| 2
| April 25
| @ Dallas
| L 99–112
| Stephen Jackson (30)
| Jason Richardson (10)
| Jason Richardson (3)
| American Airlines Center20,867
| 1–1
|- align="center" bgcolor="#ccffcc"
| 3
| April 27
| Dallas
| W 109–91
| Jason Richardson (30)
| Andris Biedriņš (10)
| Stephen Jackson (6)
| Oracle Arena20,629
| 2–1
|- align="center" bgcolor="#ccffcc"
| 4
| April 29
| Dallas
| W 103–99
| Baron Davis (33)
| Baron Davis (8)
| Baron Davis (4)
| Oracle Arena20,672
| 3–1
|- align="center" bgcolor="#ffcccc"
| 5
| May 1
| @ Dallas
| L 112–118
| Baron Davis (27)
| Mickaël Piétrus (10)
| Baron Davis (9)
| American Airlines Center21,041
| 3–2
|- align="center" bgcolor="#ccffcc"
| 6
| May 3
| Dallas
| W 111–86
| Stephen Jackson (33)
| Andris Biedriņš (12)
| Matt Barnes (7)
| Oracle Arena20,677
| 4–2
|-

|- align="center" bgcolor="#ffcccc"
| 1
| May 7
| @ Utah
| L 112–116
| Baron Davis (24)
| Barnes, Richardson (10)
| Baron Davis (7)
| EnergySolutions Arena19,911
| 0–1
|- align="center" bgcolor="#ffcccc"
| 2
| May 9
| @ Utah
| L 117–127 (OT)
| Baron Davis (36)
| Matt Barnes (7)
| Baron Davis (7)
| EnergySolutions Arena19,911
| 0–2
|- align="center" bgcolor="#ccffcc"
| 3
| May 11
| Utah
| W 125–105
| Baron Davis (32)
| Andris Biedriņš (13)
| Baron Davis (9)
| Oracle Arena20,655
| 1–2
|- align="center" bgcolor="#ffcccc"
| 4
| May 13
| Utah
| L 101–115
| Jackson, Harrington (24)
| Andris Biedriņš (10)
| Baron Davis (7)
| Oracle Arena20,679
| 1–3
|- align="center" bgcolor="#ffcccc"
| 5
| May 15
| @ Utah
| L 87–100
| Baron Davis (21)
| Jason Richardson (8)
| Baron Davis (8)
| EnergySolutions Arena19,911
| 1–4
|-

Player stats

Regular season

Playoffs 

|-
| 
| 6 || 0 || 2.5 || .333 || .000 || style=";"| 1.000 || .7 || .0 || .2 || .0 || .7
|-
| 
| style=";"| 11 || 3 || 30.0 || .450 || style=";"| .422 || .722 || 5.7 || 2.4 || 1.5 || .4 || 11.1
|-
| 
| style=";"| 11 || 8 || 24.3 || .730 || . || .533 || 6.3 || .5 || .7 || style=";"| 1.5 || 6.4
|-
| 
| style=";"| 11 || style=";"| 11 || 40.5 || .513 || .373 || .770 || 4.5 || style=";"| 6.5 || style=";"| 2.9 || .6 || style=";"| 25.3
|-
| 
| style=";"| 11 || 6 || 21.6 || .390 || .111 || .821 || 2.3 || .9 || .9 || .2 || 8.0
|-
| 
| 3 || 0 || 2.0 || style=";"| 1.000 || . || . || .7 || .0 || .0 || .0 || .7
|-
| 
| style=";"| 11 || 5 || 23.8 || .398 || .395 || .633 || 4.6 || .5 || .5 || .6 || 10.2
|-
| 
| style=";"| 11 || style=";"| 11 || style=";"| 41.3 || .379 || .361 || .816 || 3.6 || 3.6 || 2.0 || .7 || 19.9
|-
| 
| 4 || 0 || 1.5 || .000 || . || .500 || .0 || .5 || .0 || .0 || .3
|-
| 
| style=";"| 11 || 0 || 19.0 || .347 || .259 || .694 || 3.8 || .5 || .5 || .8 || 6.0
|-
| 
| 4 || 0 || 1.5 || . || . || .500 || .3 || .0 || .0 || .3 || .3
|-
| 
| style=";"| 11 || style=";"| 11 || 38.9 || .476 || .354 || .704 || style=";"| 6.7 || 2.0 || 1.3 || .5 || 19.1
|}

Roster

Transactions

Trades

Free agency

Re-signed

Additions

Subtractions

Awards

References

Golden State Warriors seasons
Golden State Warriors
Golden State Warriors
Golden State Warriors